Ayla Huser (born 27 May 1992) is a Swiss badminton player and a member of Yverdon-les-Bains club. Born in Stans, Nidwalden, Switzerland, Huser spent her childhood in Buochs. She started paying badminton at the age of ten in Buochs badminton club, and after two years she moved to Stansstad club. In 2009, she won the Swiss national U17 championships in the singles and mixed event, and in 2011 she won the singles title at the Italian Junior tournament. In the 2011/2012 seasons, she joined the Swiss national badminton squad. Huser was the semifinalists at the 2016 Finnish and 2017 Dutch International tournament. In September 2017, she won her first international senior title at the Polish International.

Achievements

BWF International Challenge/Series (2 titles) 
Women's singles

  BWF International Challenge tournament
  BWF International Series tournament
  BWF Future Series tournament

References

External links 
 Official site
 

1992 births
Living people
People from Stans
Sportspeople from Nidwalden
Swiss female badminton players
21st-century Swiss women